Masahiro Matsunaga (born May 26, 1960) is a former Japanese race car driver. From 1997 until 2004 he raced in the JGTC Series B-Class, usually finishing in the midfield. He also raced in Japanese Formula Three in 1988.

References

External links

Japanese racing drivers
1960 births
Living people
Place of birth missing (living people)
20th-century Japanese people

TOM'S drivers
Japanese Touring Car Championship drivers